D. mollis  may refer to:
 Dimorphandra mollis, the fava d'anta, a tree species found in Brazil
 Dalea mollis, a flowering plant species native to the deserts where Mexico meets the US states of California and Arizona

See also
 Mollis (disambiguation)